Barrow-in-Furness Strand railway station was the first permanent railway terminus to be built in Barrow-in-Furness, England.  Located on the Strand at St. George's Square close to the town's docks its functioning life was short, however the building itself continued to be used as the headquarters of the Furness Railway for a number of years. The station opened in 1863 having replaced a wooden structure which was erected in 1846 at adjacent Rabbit Hill. The station at St. George's square ceased commercial operations in 1882 upon the completion of a new loop line and much larger station at Abbey Road. Barrow-in-Furness Central railway station, later simply renamed Barrow-in-Furness railway station has been the town's primary station ever since.

The railway station building is Grade II listed and spent most of its later life as a working men's club.

See also
 Listed buildings in Barrow-in-Furness

References

Buildings and structures in Barrow-in-Furness
Former buildings and structures in Barrow-in-Furness
Disused railway stations in Cumbria
Former Furness Railway stations
Railway stations in Great Britain opened in 1863
Railway stations in Great Britain closed in 1882